Route 32 is an arterial state highway in Middlesex County, New Jersey, United States. The route is a  highway along Forsgate Drive that connects U.S. Route 130 (US 130) in South Brunswick Township and the New Jersey Turnpike (Interstate 95 or I-95) at exit 8A in Monroe Township. Despite the short length, it is an important artery that connects not only traffic between the Turnpike and US 130, but traffic to County Route 535 (CR 535). The right-of-way on Forsgate continues eastward as Middlesex County Route 612. Route 32 was first designated in 1964 along Forsgate Drive and was proposed to become part of New Jersey Route 92 along its entire alignment.

Route description 

Route 32 begins at a partial interchange with US 130 in South Brunswick Township. The route heads eastward, running along access ramps from US 130 and the local park and ride serving Coach USA buses to New York City. Heading onto the mainline Route 32, the highway receives the moniker of Forsgate Drive. Intersecting with a U-turn ramp from the westbound lanes, the highway serves the area as a four-lane industrial arterial. Route 32 heads further east, passing through industrial areas and local commercial headquarters. A short distance later, the highway intersects with Herrod Drive and Commerce Drive, both of which serve the local industry. Forsgate Drive continues eastward as the arterial, intersecting with CR 535 (Cranbury–South River Road). From here, Route 32 enters Monroe Township and begins serving Interchange  8A on the New Jersey Turnpike (I-95). A partial trumpet interchange, Interchange 8A serves access to CR 535 (for drivers heading to Route 32 westbound) and Route 32 eastbound. After serving another local industry, Route 32 crosses over the four-sectioned mainline of the Turnpike, where the designation ends. The road continues east as CR 612.

History 
The alignment of Route 32 was first designated in 1964, when the state took over jurisdiction of a highway from US 130 in South Brunswick, eastward along Forsgate Drive to the intersection with CR 522 and CR 535 in Monroe Township. Exit 8A originally ended at a "T" intersection with Route 32 which was modified to a trumpet interchange after 1987. This originally featured an exit ramp from the tollgate to Route 32 west, which was later changed due to heavy congestion at the ramp. The turnpike ramp to Route 32 westbound was closed off but leaving most of the old pavement in place, creating a stub ramp. In its place, a new, two-lane ramp to CR 535 was built. Motorists must now take CR 535 south to access Route 32 westbound.

Route 32's alignment from US 130 to the Turnpike was also designated to become an alignment of Route 92, a tolled extension of the New Jersey Turnpike. Route 32 and nearby Friendship Road were to be supplanted by Route 92, using exit 8A on the turnpike for the eastern terminus. However, after years of struggle to get the toll route built, the New Jersey Turnpike Authority canceled the Route 92 project on December 1, 2006.

Future
Due to congestion from Interchange 8A of the turnpike, the Turnpike Authority is proposing a project to improve traffic congestion along Route 32 called the "Interchange 8A to Route 130 Connection." The project would start from US 130 in South Brunswick and end at Interchange 8A in Monroe. Plans and dates have yet to be determined.

Major intersections

See also

References

External links 

New Jersey Highway Ends – 32
Speed Limits for Route 32

Transportation in Middlesex County, New Jersey
032